Team Bath is an English netball team based at the University of Bath. Their senior team plays in the Netball Superleague. In 2005–06 they were both founder members and the inaugural champions of the league. They were Superleague champions again in 2006–07, 2008–09, 2009–10 and 2013, and British Fast5 All-Stars Champions in 2021. The netball team is one of several sports teams based at the University of Bath that use the Team Bath brand name. Others include an association football team and a field hockey team.

History

Early years
The modern Team Bath netball team was formed during the late 1990s following the merger of several clubs and teams. These include Bath Netball Club, Bath Tigers and the Toucans Netball Club. The Team Bath Toucans name is still used by Team Bath's National Premier League team.

Super Cup
Between 2001 and 2005, Team Bath Force, together with five other franchises – Northern Flames, London Tornadoes, London Hurricanes, University of Birmingham Blaze and Northern Thunder – competed in the Super Cup. In 2004, with a squad that included Sara Bayman, Rachel Dunn, Jess Garland, Tamsin Greenway and Geva Mentor, Team Bath won the Super Cup. In the final they defeated Northern Thunder 49–43. In 2005, with a squad that included Sara Bayman and Pamela Cookey, Team Bath also won the BUCS netball championship for the first time.

Netball Superleague
In 2005 Team Bath were named as the South West England/West of England franchise in the new Netball Superleague. Together with Brunel Hurricanes, Celtic Dragons, Leeds Carnegie, Galleria Mavericks, Northern Thunder, Loughborough Lightning and Team Northumbria, Team Bath were founder members of the league. In 2005–06 with a squad that included Pamela Cookey, Rachel Dunn, Stacey Francis, Jess Garland, Tamsin Greenway and Geva Mentor, Team Bath won the inaugural Netball Superleague title. Team Bath won further Netball Superleague titles in 2006–07, 2008–09, 2009–10 and 2013.

Senior finals

Super Cup

Netball Superleague Grand Finals
Between 2006 and 2009–10, Team Bath played in four out of five Netball Superleague Grand Finals. They reached their first Grand Final for eight years in 2021.

Fast5 Netball All-Stars Championship
Team Bath played in the inaugural British Fast5 Netball All-Stars Championship final in 2017  and won the competition for the first time in 2021.

Home venue
Team Bath play their home matches in the Team Bath Arena at the Sports Training Village on the University of Bath campus.

Notable players

2023 squad

Internationals

 Shaunagh Craig
 Fionnuala Toner

 Khanyisa Chawane
 Lenize Potgieter
 Karla Pretorius
 Zanele Vimbela

 Vangelee Williams

 Claire Brownie

 Chelsea Lewis
Betsy Creak

Coaches

Head coaches

Directors of netball

Seasons
 2016 Team Bath netball season
 2017 Team Bath netball season
 2018 Team Bath netball season
 2019 Team Bath netball season
 2020 Team Bath netball season
2021 Team Bath netball season

Honours
Netball Superleague
Winners: 2005–06, 2006–07, 2008–09, 2009–10, 2013: 5
Runners-up: 2021: 1
British Fast5 Netball All-Stars Championship
Winners: 2021: 1
Runners up: 2017: 1
Super Cup
Winners: 2004: 1
Mike Greenwood Trophy
Winners: 2015: 1
Runners up: 2016: 1

References

External links
 Team Bath on Facebook
  Team Bath on Twitter

 
Netball teams in England
netball
Netball Superleague teams